Mecidiye Mosque may refer to:
 Ortaköy Mosque, also known as the (Büyük) Mecidiye Mosque, in the Ortaköy neighbourhood of Istanbul
 Küçük Mecidiye Mosque in the Çırağan neighbourhood of Istanbul
 Chios Byzantine Museum in Chios, Greece, formerly called the Mecidiye Mosque

Mosque disambiguation pages